15 Cygni is a single star in the northern constellation Cygnus. With an apparent visual magnitude of 4.90, it is a faint star but visible to the naked eye. It is moving closer to the Sun with a heliocentric radial velocity of −23.6 km/s.

This is an aging giant star with a stellar classification of G8 III, having consumed the hydrogen at its core and evolved off the main sequence. It is a red clump giant, which means it is generating energy via helium fusion at its core. The star is 1.50 billion years old with 2.3 times the mass of the Sun, and has expanded to 12 times the Sun's radius. It is radiating 93 times the Sun's luminosity from its enlarged photosphere at an effective temperature of 4,920 K.

References

G-type giants
Horizontal-branch stars
Cygnus (constellation)
Durchmusterung objects
Cygni, 15
186675
097118
7517